Austrodontura castletoni, known as Castleton's Flightless Katydid, is a species of katydid in the family Phaneropterinae. It is named after the artist Gavin Castleton. The species is endemic to South Africa.

References

Insects described in 2011